Kenneth Burns Conn DFC (11 July 1896 – 30 January 1984) was a Canadian First World War flying ace, officially credited with 20 victories.

Text of citations

Distinguished Flying Cross
"Lt. Kenneth Burns Conn (3rd Res. Bn., Can. E.F.). (FRANCE)
On 18 October, when raiding enemy troops in retreat, this officer descended to 300 feet and attacked three companies of infantry with machine-gun fire, inflicting casualties. So vigorous was his attack that the troops dispersed. Lt. Conn then attacked various other targets, displaying conspicuous skill and initiative."

References

Notes

Websites

Canadian aviators
Canadian World War I flying aces
Recipients of the Distinguished Flying Cross (United Kingdom)
1896 births
1984 deaths
People from Ottawa
Canadian Expeditionary Force officers
Canadian military personnel from Ontario